Clathrina rubra is a species of calcareous sponge from France.

References
World Register of Marine Species entry

Clathrina
Animals described in 1958
Fauna of France